Palm Valley is a ghost town, a formerly independent community on US Route 79, now incorporated into Round Rock,  in the county of  Williamson, in the U.S. state of Texas.

The community was named for its founder, Swedish settler Anna Palm, a widow with six sons, who arrived in 1853. The family lived in tents, and eventually built a house. The Palm family was shortly followed by other Swedish immigrants. The Palm Valley Lutheran Church was built in 1872 and doubled as a schoolhouse. In 1970, the church was designated a Recorded Texas Historic Landmark. Anna's son Andrew J. Palm built his own home in 1873. The house was moved to Round Rock in 1976. Two years later the home was also designated a Recorded Texas Historic Landmark and is open to the public as the Palm House Museum. By the beginning of the 21st century, Palm Valley Lutheran Church remained but the community had lost its distinct identity.

References

Ghost towns in Central Texas
Populated places established in 1853
Recorded Texas Historic Landmarks
Unincorporated communities in Texas
Swedish-American culture in Texas
Swedish-American history